Kadannapalli is a census town in Kannur district of Kerala state, India.

Location
Kadannappalli is located 33 km north of Kannur city on the Mangalore road.

Post office
There is a post office in the village and the pin code is 670504.

Administration
Kadannappalli census town is part of Kadannappalli-Panappuzha Panchayat in Payyannur Taluk and Kalliasseri Block. Kadannappalli is politically part of Kalliasseri Assembly constituency under Kasaragod Loksabha constituency.

Demographics
As of 2011 Census, Kadannappalli had a population of 10,430, of which 4,848 are males while 5,582 are females. The sex ratio was 1151 females to 1000 males. In Kadannappalli, 10.5% of total population were under 6 years age. The literacy rate of Kadannappalli was 93.27% lower than state average of 94%.

Religion
As of 2011 Indian census, Kadannappalli census town had total population of 10,430 which constitutes 80% Hindus, 12.6% Muslims, 7.1% Christians and 0.3% others.

See also
 Mathamangalam
 Vellora
 Olayampadi
 Pilathara
 Pariyaram
 Eramam

References

Villages near Pilathara
Cities and towns in Kannur district